Midnight Radio is the second full-length album from ambient/jazz band Bohren & der Club of Gore, released in 1995. It is also the last Bohren album to feature guitarist Reiner Henseleit, who was replaced on the band's next album, Sunset Mission, by saxophone player Christoph Clöser.

Track listing

Personnel
 Thorsten Benning – drums
 Morten Gass – piano, Rhodes
 Robin Rodenberg – bass
 Reiner Henseleit – guitar

References 

Bohren & der Club of Gore albums
1995 albums

pt:Bohren & der Club of Gore